Mianrud Rural District is a rural district (dehestan) in Chamestan District, Nur County, Mazandaran Province, Iran. At the 2006 census, its population was 13,906, in 3,499 families. The rural district has 41 villages.

References 

Rural Districts of Mazandaran Province
Nur County